Acronicta connecta, the connected dagger moth,  is a species of moth of the family Noctuidae. It is found from the Great Lakes region to central New England, south to Florida, west to Texas and Utah.

Adults are on wing from May to August, depending on the location.

The larvae feed on leaves of Salix species.

Subspecies
Acronicta connecta connecta
Acronicta connecta albina

External links
Bug Guide

Acronicta
Moths of North America
Moths described in 1873